There are three Christian churches in India follows Oriental Orthodox tradition. All of them are based primarily in the state of Kerala. They are:

Malankara Orthodox Syrian Church, an autocephalous Oriental Orthodox Church based in Kerala
Jacobite Syrian Christian Church, an autonomous Oriental Orthodox Church based in Kerala and an integral branch of the Syriac Orthodox Church
Malabar Independent Syrian Church, an independent Church based in Kerala follows the Oriental Orthodox tradition, but is not in communion with other Oriental Orthodox churches.